Bienvenidos al Lolita is a Spanish dramedy television series set in a cabaret club. Produced by Globomedia for Antena 3, it aired on the latter channel from January 2014 to February 2014.

Premise 
The series deals about the backstage mishaps of a troupe of people (a "dysfunctional family") working at a time of economic crisis at the Lolita Cabaret, a cabaret club located in Madrid.

Cast 
 Beatriz Carvajal as Dolores Reina.
  as Don José Luis Carrión.
 Natalia Verbeke as Violeta Reina.
 Roberto Álamo as Cúper.
 Carlos Santos as Alfredo.
 Sara Vega as Roxy.
 Rodrigo Guirao as Jota.
 Nerea Camacho as Greta.
  as Reverendo.
 Cristina Peña as Norma del Pino.
 Maggie Civantos interpreta a Fanny.
  as Lupe.
 Estefanía de los Santos as Charo.
 Font García as Virgilio.
 Denisse Peña as Daniela.
 Álvaro Balas as Xuxo.
 Lucía Balas as Nuri.
 Pablo Espinosa as Camilo.

Production and release 
Bienvenidos al Lolita, tentatively titled Lolita Cabaret before its release, was inspired in the classical Spanish comedy genre from the 1950s and 1960s. The series was produced by Globomedia, whereas Daniel Écija, Álex Pina, Fernando González Molina and Esther Martínez Lobato were credited as executive producers. Fernando González Molina, David Molina and Sandra Gallego directed the episodes. The 6-month-long filming was wrapped up by November 2013. Shooting took place in Madrid.

The series premiered on 7 January 2014, with a "promising" 18.4% share. However interest rapidly waned, and the audience share went all the way down to a 10.5% in the sixth episode. Antena 3 then decided not to renovate the series, with the last 2 episodes yet to be aired. The broadcasting run of the 8-episode season ended on 25 February 2014, averaging 2,658,000 viewers and a 14.0% share.

The misfiring of the series reportedly made Pina "realize the need to regenerate the prevailing model of national television". According to Pina, the series' direst mistake was "not being coherent with the plot", "making a cabaret series" (...) "without being absolutely transgressive is a mistake".

References 

Television shows set in Madrid
2014 Spanish television series debuts
2014 Spanish television series endings
2010s Spanish drama television series
2010s Spanish comedy television series
2010s comedy-drama television series
Antena 3 (Spanish TV channel) network series
Television shows filmed in Spain
Spanish-language television shows
Spanish comedy-drama television series
Television series by Globomedia